Judith Ann Stewart Stock is an American government employee who served as the Assistant Secretary of State for Educational and Cultural Affairs, from June 23, 2010, until July 2013.

Early life and education

Stock, an Indiana native, received her B.A. from Purdue University.

Career 
After college, she worked as an elementary school teacher and as a Pan Am flight attendant based in Washington, D.C.

During the 1980 U.S. presidential election, Stock was deputy press secretary for Vice President of the United States Walter Mondale. She then became Vice President of Corporate Communications and Public Relations for Bloomingdale's.

In 1993, President of the United States Bill Clinton named Stock White House Social Secretary, a post she held until 1997. From September 1997 to June 2010, she was Vice President of Institutional Affairs at the John F. Kennedy Center for the Performing Arts.

In 2010, President Barack Obama named Stock Assistant Secretary of State for Educational and Cultural Affairs and after Senate confirmation, she was sworn in on June 23, 2010. She was succeeded by Evan Ryan.

Stock serves on the board of Americans for the Arts and the Americans for the Arts Action Fund.

References

External links 
 State Department Biography of Ann Stock
 AmericansForTheArts.org

|-

Living people
United States Assistant Secretaries of State
Purdue University alumni
People from Indiana
American women diplomats
American diplomats
Year of birth missing (living people)
21st-century American women